Tabun may refer to:

 Tabun (nerve agent), the first nerve-agent chemical weapon to be discovered
 "Tabun" (song), a 2020 single by Japanese music duo Yoasobi
 Tabun Cave, part of a World Heritage Site related to human evolution at Mount Carmel in Israel
 Basmat Tab'un, a town in Israel
 Tabun oven, a clay oven used in the Middle East to make bread
 Tabun-Khara-Obo crater, a meteor impact crater in Mongolia
 Andres Tabun (born 1954), Estonian actor
 Tabun, a barangay of Angeles City in the Philippines
 Tabun, a barangay of Mabalacat in the Philippines